How to Socialise & Make Friends is the second studio album by Australian alternative rock trio Camp Cope. The album was released on 2 March 2018 through Poison City Records and debuted and peaked at number 6 on the ARIA Charts.

At the Music Victoria Awards of 2018, the album was nominated for Best Rock/Punk Album and Best Album, while the trio won Best Band at the same awards ceremony. At the AIR Awards of 2019, the album was nominated for Best Independent Hard Rock, Heavy or Punk Album and Australian Album of the Year at the J Awards of 2018.

Reception

Timothy Monger from AllMusic said "As with their debut, the production is unfussy, bordering on lo-fi, and focused on the live unfiltered elements of the three musicians playing in a room together. McDonald's songwriting is melodic and bittersweet, more often than not tumbling into catharsis and wounded outrage midway through. There's an intense magnetism to her vocals as she wields her emotional sword, channeling vulnerability and danger into something unpredictable and uncomfortably human, especially on standouts like 'The Opener', 'Anna' and 'Sagan-Indiana'. In sharing rather than preaching their experiences, Camp Cope offer something personally therapeutic that also challenges listeners."

Track listing

Charts

Release history

References

2018 albums
Camp Cope albums